Norra begravningsplatsen, literally "The Northern Cemetery" in Swedish, is a major cemetery of the Stockholm urban area, located in Solna Municipality. Inaugurated on 9 June 1827, it is the burial site for a number of Swedish notables.

Notable interments
 Salomon August Andrée (1854–1897), polar explorer
 Klas Pontus Arnoldson (1844–1916), Nobel laureate in Peace
 Kurt Atterberg (1887–1974), composer
 Barbro Bäckström (1939–1990), sculptor
 Ingrid Bergman (1915–1982), actress
 Bo Bergman (1869–1967), author, poet and lyricist
 Estelle Bernadotte ''née Manville (1904–1984), American–Swedish countess
 Folke Bernadotte (1895–1948), diplomat
 Franz Berwald (1796–1868), classical composer
 Arne Beurling (1905–1986), mathematician, professor of mathematics
 Ulla Billquist (1907–1946), singer
 Ulf Björlin (1933–1993), conductor and composer
 Gunnar Björnstrand (1909–1989), actor
 August Blanche (1811–1868), writer, publicist and politician
 Catharina Rosaura "Rosa" Carlén (1836–1883), author
 Charles de Champs (1873–1959), vice-admiral of the Swedish Navy
 Augusta Christie-Linde (1870–1953), zoologist
 Isak Gustaf Clason (1856–1930), architect
 Richard Dybeck (1811–1877), jurist and author of the lyrics to the Swedish national anthem
 Gösta Ekman (senior) (1890–1938), actor
 Hasse Ekman (1915–2004), actor, director and writer
 Karin Fjällbäck-Holmgren (1881–1963), politician, suffragist and women's rights activist
 Knut Frænkel (1870–1897), engineer and Arctic explorer
 Isaac Grünewald (1889–1946), painter
 Allvar Gullstrand (1862–1930), physician and Nobel laureate in Medicine
 Justus Hagman (1859–1936), actor
 Waldemar Hammenhög (1902–1972), writer and novelist
 Per Albin Hansson (1885–1946), Prime Minister of Sweden
 Sofya Kovalevskaya (1850–1891), mathematician and writer
 Ivar Kreuger (1880–1932), industrialist and financier
 Gustaf de Laval (1845–1932), engineer and inventor
 Arvid Lindman (1862–1936), Prime Minister of Sweden
 Vilhelm Moberg (1898–1973), author
 Karin Molander (1889–1978), actress
 Alfred Nobel (1833–1896), inventor and founder of the Nobel Prize
 Alice Nordin (1871–1948), sculptor
 Anna Norrie (1860–1957), operetta singer
 Jenny Nyström (1854–1946), artist and illustrator
 Samuel Owen (1774–1854), engineer, inventor and industrialist
 Ellen Palmstierna (1869–1941), women's rights and peace activist
 Ernst Rolf (1891–1932), entertainer and theatrical producer
 Nelly Sachs (1891–1970), author and Nobel laureate in literature
 Ulrich Salchow (1877–1949), world and Olympic figure skating champion
 Victor Sjöström (Victor Seastrom) (1879–1960), international film director
 Wilhelmina Skogh (1849–1926), businesswoman and hotel manager
 Rudolf Spielmann (1883–1942), world-class chess player
 Karl Staaff (1860–1915), Prime Minister of Sweden
 Emerik Stenberg (1873–1927), painter
 Mauritz Stiller (1883–1928), film director and actor
 August Strindberg (1849–1912), author and playwright
 Nils Strindberg (1872–1897), photographer and Arctic explorer
 Inga Tidblad (1901–1975), actress
 Hugo Theorell (1903–1982), scientist and Nobel laureate in Medicine

References

 hittagraven.stockholm.se

External links

 Official website

Cemeteries in Sweden
Metropolitan Stockholm
1827 establishments in Sweden
Buildings and structures in Stockholm County
Tourist attractions in Stockholm County